Rubble & Crew is a Canadian computer-animated children's television series and a spin-off of Spin Master's PAW Patrol brand. It is produced by Spin Master Entertainment, with animation provided by Jam Filled Toronto. Corus Entertainment also receives a production credit on the series.

Unlike the original series, which airs on TVOntario in Canada, Rubble & Crew airs on Treehouse TV and StackTV. Both services are owned by the spin-off's co-producer, Corus Entertainment. In the United States, it airs on Nickelodeon. The series' first episode was released on the official Rubble & Crew YouTube channel on January 9, 2023.

Plot
Builder Cove is the neighboring town of Adventure Bay. While attending his family reunion in Adventure Bay, Rubble is called to Builder Cove to help in its construction projects. After building a bridge to Builder Cove, Rubble suggests that his family moves to Builder Cove where they establish a construction company called Rubble & Crew that operates out of the Barkyard in order to help maintain his duties to the PAW Patrol. Rubble & Crew would help expand Builder Cove by expanding buildings and making new buildings for it's different proprietors while contending with a rival construction worker named Speed Meister. When the job is done, Rubble & Crew perform the "Wiggle and Wag" dance & "We're a Pup Family" dance.

Characters

Rubble & Crew
 Rubble (voiced by Luxton Handspiker) - A bulldog and a member of the PAW Patrol who becomes the founder and the leader of Rubble & Crew. He drives around in a bulldozer. Handspiker originally voiced Rex in Season 7 and replaces Lucien Duncan-Reid from the original series.
 Grandpa Gravel (voiced by Martin Roach) - A Serrano Bulldog and the grandfather of Rubble. He drives around in a food truck where he makes some kibble for his family.
 Auntie Crane (voiced by Sabrina Jalees) - A continental bulldog, the aunt of Rubble, the daughter of Gravel, and the mother of Motor. She operates the supply warehouse in the Barkyard and drives around in a forklift.
 Mix (voiced by Shazdeh Kapadia) - An English bulldog and the cousin of Rubble who handles mixing things that are associated with construction like concrete, paint, cement, and glue. She drives around in a cement truck.
 Charger (voiced by Alessandro Pugiotto) - A French Bulldog and the cousin of Rubble who handles the digging for construction projects. He sports a prosthetic left back leg and drives around in a crane. He tends to get the "Zoom Zoom Zoomies" when filled with excitement causing everyone to give him room for it.
 Wheeler (voiced by Liam McKenna) - A Swiss hound and the cousin of Rubble who is a clean freak and handles everything involving nuts and bolts. He drives around in a dump truck that he uses to carry dug-up dirt and different construction supplies. He is the only member who is not a bulldog.
 Motor (voiced by Alberta Bolan) - A Ca de Bou, the daughter of Crane, the granddaughter of Gravel, and the youngest cousin of Rubble who operates handles the smashing needed for the construction projects. She can also speak in the third person and drives around in a wrecking ball vehicle.

Supporting characters
 Mayor Greatway (voiced by Leslie Adlam) - The mayor of Builder Cove with a daredevil-like personality. She is the sister of Mayor Goodway.
 Mr. Ducky Doo - Mayor Greatway's pet duck.
 Speed Meister (voiced by Cory Doran) - A construction worker who becomes the rival of Rubble & Crew. He works fast with disastrous results.
 Mr. McTurtle (voiced by Cory Doran) - Speed Meister's pet turtle who mostly quotes "Yep-a-roozie".
 Omar (voiced by Deven Mack) - An inhabitant of Builder Cove.
 Lily (voiced by Mikayla SwamiNathan) - The daughter of Omar.
 Shopkeeper Shelley (voiced by Jonathan Langdon) - The proprietor of a bike shop in Builder Cove. His bike shop was expanded by Rubble & Crew so that he can sell more bicycles.
 Camila (voiced by Paloma Nunez) - A truck driver.
 Café Carl (voiced by Jonathan Tan) - An ice cream vendor who becomes the proprietor of an ice cream shop that Rubble & Crew build for him.
 Grocer Gabriel (voiced by Andy Toth) - The proprietor of a grocery store who tends to sing some of his exclamations.
 Park Ranger Rose (voiced by Ophira Calof) - 
 Lucas (voiced by Housten Daghigi) - 
 Juniper (voiced by Josette Jorge) - 
 River (voiced by Chiang Ma) - 
 Farmer Zoe (voiced by Krystal Meadows) - A farmer who is Farmer Al's sister.

Returning characters
 Ryder (voiced by Kai Harris) - The leader of the PAW Patrol who meets up with Rubble and met his family at a family reunion. He debuted in "The Crew Builds a Bridge".
 Mayor Goodway (voiced by Kim Roberts) - Adventure Bay's mayor and the sister of Mayor Greatway who calls Ryder as she needs her sister to enlist Rubble and his family. She debuted in "The Crew Builds a Bridge".

Production
A TV series was ordered after the success of the film PAW Patrol: The Movie and would focus on one of the main pups from the series. On March 24, 2022, it was announced that the spin-off series will focus on Rubble.

Episodes

Notes

References

External links

 
 

2020s Canadian animated television series
2020s Canadian children's television series
2023 Canadian television series debuts
Animated television series about dogs
Canadian animated television spin-offs
Canadian children's animated television series
Canadian computer-animated television series
English-language television shows
TVO original programming
Toy brands